UK Jive is the twenty-third studio album by the English rock group, the Kinks, released in 1989. It was the first album in almost three years since the 1986 album, Think Visual. At this point, it was the longest gap between album releases since the inception of the group.

Track listing

Original release

Bonus tracks on CD

Personnel
The Kinks
Ray Davies – guitar, keyboards, vocals
Dave Davies – lead guitar, vocals
Jim Rodford – bass, backing vocals
Ian Gibbons – keyboards, backing vocals
Bob Henrit – drums, percussion
Mark Haley – additional keyboards on "Down All The Days (Till 1992)"

Additional personnel
Mick Avory – drums, percussion on "Entertainment", production
Alan O'Duffy – assistant to producer
Joe Gibb, Alan O'Duffy – engineer
Trevor Rogers – photography

References

1989 albums
The Kinks albums
Albums produced by Ray Davies